The 2017 EuroHockey Club Champions Cup is the 45th edition of the premier European competition for women's field hockey clubs. HC Den Bosch and 's-Hertogenbosch hosted the championship tournament for the seventh time. The tournament took place from 2 to 5 June. Eight teams from six countries participated in the tournament.

Results

Bracket

Quarter-finals

Fifth to eighth place classification

Crossover

Seventh and eighth place

Fifth and sixth place

First to fourth place classification

Semi-finals

Third place

Final

Awards

Statistics

Final standings

References

External links
 Altius RT - Eurohockey - Tournament results and statistics

EuroHockey Club Champions Cup (women)
EuroHockey Club Champions Cup
EuroHockey Club Champions Cup
International women's field hockey competitions hosted by the Netherlands
EuroHockey Club Champions Cup
EuroHockey Club Champions Cup
Sports competitions in 's-Hertogenbosch